Joaquim Maria Alcobia (1 November 1916 – deceased) was a Portuguese footballer who played as midfielder.

Career
Alcobia started at Sporting CP in 1935, but was at Benfica that he gained recognition. He arrived there in 1937 and made his debut on the league opener on 10 January 1937 with Vitória de Setúbal. Despite playing less than a handful of games, he won his first league title in the same year.

In the next three seasons, Alcobia played only one league game, as Albino or Gaspar Pinto left him little chance to play. Starting in 1940, his playing time increased and he helped Benfica win the league in 1941–42 and 1942–43, and the Taça de Portugal in 1942–43, departing the club in 1944.

Honours
Benfica
Primeira Divisão: 1936–37, 1941–42, 1942–43
Taça de Portugal: 1942–43
Campeonato de Lisboa: 1936–37

References
General
 

Specific

External links
 

1916 births
Year of death unknown
Portuguese footballers
Sporting CP footballers
S.L. Benfica footballers
Primeira Liga players
Association football midfielders